A Watched Pot is the third studio album by Bleu, following Redhead.

History
A Watched Pot was recorded with John Fields in 2005 for Aware/Columbia Records.
A few weeks after finishing the record, Bleu was dropped from the label (as well as many other artists) because of downsizing of Sony.
This didn't stop him from playing his songs and streaming them (and new ones) at Myspace. The record was not released on CD or digital until 2009.
These four years were full of creative work: Bleu moved from Boston to L.A., put out L.E.O. —Alpacas Orgling (a project with Mike Viola, Andy Sturmer of Jellyfish and Jason Scheff of Chicago), founded The Major Labels (a power-pop project with Mike Viola and Ducky Carlisle) and released Aquavia (the first and maybe last record of group), and worked as a producer.

Bleu said: "It truly means the world to me to finally get this record released. It always feels good to put your art out in to the world, but after all I've gone through for this material to see the light of day, the reward is particularly sweet."

Songs
The A Watched Pot sessions resulted in these songs:
 "Save Me"
 "Boy Meets Girl"
 "Come 'n' Go"
 "The Blame Game"
 "It Can't Be Bad (If It Feels So Good)"
 "Go"
 "I Won't Fuck You Over (This Time)"
 "What Now"
 "What Kinda Man Am I"
 No Such Thing As Love
 The Penguin Song
 "I'm in Love with My Lover"
 "Kiss Me"
 "One Day"
 "Singin' in Tongues"
 "When the Lights Go Out"
 "A Watched Pot"

The retail version was finally released on July 14, 2009, with the following track list:
 "Save Me"
 "Come 'n Go"
 "No Such Thing as Love"
 "Boy Meets Girl"
 "Kiss Me"
 "I Won't Fuck You Over (This Time)"
 "When the Lights Go Out"
 "What Now?"
 "Go"
 "One Day"
 "What Kinda Man Am I?"
 "The Penguin Song" (hidden track)

"I'm in Love with My Lover" and "Singin in Tongues" were used for "FOUR" (the follow-up of A Watched Pot in 2010) while "The Blame Game", "It Can't Be Bad" and "A Watched Pot" were released with "Besides", a compilation of B-Sides and previously unreleased material in 2011.

There are official videos for "No Such Thing As Love" and "Come'n'Go".

References

2009 albums
Bleu (musician) albums